The 2011 Coppa Italia Final was the final match of the 2010–11 Coppa Italia, the 64th season of the top cup competition in Italian football. The match was played at the Stadio Olimpico in Rome on 29 May 2011 between Internazionale and Palermo. Internazionale won by 3–1 to retain the trophy.

Road to the final

Match

Details

Notes

References
 

2011
Coppa Italia Final 2011
Coppa Italia Final 2011
Coppa Italia Final